20α-Dihydrodydrogesterone (20α-DHD), also known as 20α-hydroxydydrogesterone, as well as 20(S)-hydroxy-9β,10α-pregna-4,6-dien-3-one, is a progestin and the major active metabolite of dydrogesterone. It appears that dydrogesterone is a prodrug of 20α-DHD, as it is largely transformed into this metabolite when given orally in humans. 20α-DHD has progestogenic activity similarly to dydrogesterone, but is far less potent in comparison.

See also
 20α-Dihydroprogesterone
 20α-Dihydrotrengestone

References

Secondary alcohols
Conjugated dienes
Human drug metabolites
Enones
Pregnanes
Progestogens